The Central African ambassador in Washington, D. C. is the official representative of the Government in Bangui to the Government of the United States.

List of representatives

References 

 
United States
Central African Republic